The Dobbertiner See is a lake within the Sternberger Seenlandschaft in Mecklenburg-Vorpommern, Germany.

References

External links 

 

Lakes of Mecklenburg-Western Pomerania